Peter A. Hilton House is a historic home located at Beekman Corners in Schoharie County, New York.  It was built about 1799 is a -story, five-bay, gable-roofed brick residence in the Federal style.  A gable-roofed, -story brick kitchen wing projects from the rear.  Also on the property is a Dutch barn (ca 1800), horse barn (c. 1835), and pig / sheep barn (c. 1850).

It was listed on the National Register of Historic Places in 2004.

References

Houses on the National Register of Historic Places in New York (state)
Federal architecture in New York (state)
Houses completed in 1799
Houses in Schoharie County, New York
National Register of Historic Places in Schoharie County, New York